The Europe/Africa Zone was one of the three zones of the regional Davis Cup competition in 1999.

In the Europe/Africa Zone there were four different tiers, called groups, in which teams competed against each other to advance to the upper tier. Winners in Group II advanced to the Europe/Africa Zone Group I. Teams who lost their respective ties competed in the relegation play-offs, with winning teams remaining in Group II, whereas teams who lost their play-offs were relegated to the Europe/Africa Zone Group III in 2000.

Participating nations

Draw

 and  promoted to Group I in 2000.

First round

Denmark vs. Senegal

Ireland vs. Slovenia

Hungary vs. Greece

Bulgaria vs. Togo

Latvia vs. Poland

Ivory Coast vs. Macedonia

Morocco vs. Yugoslavia

Norway vs. Turkey

Second round

Denmark vs. Ireland

Hungary vs. Bulgaria

Ivory Coast vs. Poland

Norway vs. Morocco

Relegation play-offs

Slovenia vs. Senegal

Togo vs. Greece

Latvia vs. Macedonia

Turkey vs. Yugoslavia

Third round

Hungary vs. Denmark

Morocco vs. Poland

References

External links
Davis Cup official website

Davis Cup Europe/Africa Zone
Europe Africa Zone Group II